Camphora officinarum is a species of evergreen tree that is commonly known under the names camphor tree, camphorwood or camphor laurel.

Description 
Camphora officinarum is native to China south of the Yangtze River, Taiwan, southern Japan, Korea, India and Vietnam, and has been introduced to many other countries. In Japan, where the tree is called kusunoki, five camphor trees are known with a trunk circumference above , with the largest individual, reaching 24.22 m.

The leaves have a glossy, waxy appearance and smell of camphor when crushed. In spring, it produces bright green foliage with masses of small white flowers. Its pale bark is very rough and fissured vertically.

Certain trees in Japan are considered sacred. An example of the importance of a sacred tree is the 700-year old camphor growing in the middle of Kayashima Station. Locals protested against moving the tree when the railway station had to be expanded, so the station was built around it.

Uses

C. camphora is cultivated for camphor and timber production. The production and shipment of camphor, in a solid, waxy form, was a major industry in Taiwan prior to and during the Japanese colonial era (1895–1945). It was used medicinally and was also an important ingredient in the production of smokeless gunpowder and celluloid. Primitive stills were set up in the mountainous areas in which the tree is usually found. The wood was chipped; these chips were steamed in a retort, allowing the camphor to crystallize on the inside of a crystallization box after the vapour had passed through a cooling chamber. It was then scraped off and packed out to government-run factories for processing and sale. Camphor was one of the most lucrative of several important government monopolies under the Japanese.

The wood has an insect-repellent quality.

Camphor 

Camphor is a white crystalline substance, obtained from the tree C. camphora. Camphor has been used for many centuries as a culinary spice, a component of incense, and as a medicine. It is also an insect repellent and a flea-killing substance.

Chemical constituents
The species contains volatile chemical compounds in all plant parts, and the wood and leaves are steam distilled for the essential oils. Camphor laurel has six different chemical variants called chemotypes, which are camphor, linalool, 1,8-cineole, nerolidol, safrole, and borneol. In China, field workers avoid mixing chemotypes when harvesting by their odour. The cineole fraction of camphor laurel is used in China to manufacture fake "eucalyptus oil".

The chemical variants (or chemotypes) seem dependent upon the country of origin of the tree. e.g., C. camphora grown in Taiwan and Japan is normally very high in linalool, often between 80 and 85%. In India and Sri Lanka, the high camphor variety/chemotype remains dominant. C. camphora grown in Madagascar, though, is high in 1,8-cineole (averaging between 40 and 50%). The essential oil from the Madagascar trees is commercially known as ravintsara.

Invasive species

In Australia

Camphor laurel was introduced to Australia in 1822 as an ornamental tree for use in gardens and public parks. It has become a noxious weed  throughout Queensland and central to northern New South Wales, where it is suited to the wet, subtropical climate. The camphor content of the leaf litter helps prevent other plants from germinating successfully, helping to ensure the camphor's success against any potentially competing vegetation, and the seeds are attractive to birds and pass intact through the digestive system, ensuring rapid distribution. Camphor laurel invades rainforests and pastures, and also competes against eucalyptus trees, certain species of which are the sole food source of koalas. In its favour, however, younger camphor laurel trees can quickly develop hollows, which can be utilised by wildlife, whereas natives can take hundreds of years to develop hollows.

In the United States

Introduced to the contiguous United States around 1875, C. camphora has become naturalized in portions of Alabama, California, Florida, Virginia, Georgia, Hawaii, Louisiana, Mississippi, North Carolina, Texas, and South Carolina.  It has been declared a category I invasive species in Florida.

Insect pests
In Australia, two native butterflies, the purple brown-eye and common red-eye, larval stages feed on camphor despite it being an introduced plant.

See also
 Sandalwood
 My Neighbor Totoro

References

External links 

 Camphor laurel fact sheet—Produced by the Queensland Department of Primary Industries and Fisheries
Campaign to stop the spread of camphor laurels in Australia

Spices
Medicinal plants of Asia
Naturalized trees of Alabama
Trees of China
Trees of Japan
Trees of Korea
Trees of Taiwan
Trees of Vietnam
officinarum